The 1981 Overseas Final was the inaugural running of the Overseas Final as part of the qualification for the 1981 Speedway World Championship Final to be held at the Wembley Stadium in London], England. The 1981 Final was run on 12 July at the White City Stadium in London, and was the second last qualifying round for Commonwealth and [American riders.

The Top 10 riders qualified for the Intercontinental Final to be held at the Speedway Center in Vojens, Denmark. England's Dave Jessup won the first ever Overseas Final.

1981 Overseas Final
12 July
 London, White City Stadium
Qualification: Top 10 plus 1 reserve to the Intercontinental Final in Vojens, Denmark

See also
 Motorcycle Speedway

References

1981
World Individual
Overseas Final
Overseas Final